Krystyna Lubomirska is the name of:

Krystyna Lubomirska (d. 1645) (17th-century–1645), Polish Countess
Krystyna Lubomirska (d. 1669) (17th-century–1669), Polish Princess